Lauren Evans (born February 3, 1983) is an American singer and platinum-selling songwriter. She is an ASCAP Award Winner and has written hit singles for Alexandra Burke, Monrose, Jordin Sparks, and Camila. As a songwriter, Evans has achieved five platinum certifications and two gold certifications in six countries.

Early life
Evans grew up in San Bernardino, California, the daughter of a pastor, John Evans, of Promise Keepers and Maranatha! Music; a Christian record label for which she has recorded several popular songs for. Evans' cover of "You're Worthy of My Praise" became an oft-played radio hit for the label.

Career
Lauren's music career got an early start from working with production duo Buster & Shavoni who featured her on DreamWorks' The Prince of Egypt soundtrack under the pseudonym Christian. "Didn't I," co-written by Evans, earned her a 1999 Stellar Award nomination for Contemporary Female Vocalist of the Year. Collaborating with producer Rex Rideout, another of her compositions "Brighter Days" was featured in the 2003 film The Fighting Temptations.

Evans has also made her success on TV, contributing her vocals featured on Disney Channel projects such as That's So Raven, The Cheetah Girls, High School Musical, Jump In, Cory in the House. Lauren was also the singing voice behind 4KidsTV's animated series Bratz. Lauren's work on the series was released in 2006 as the compilation album Bratz: Genie Magic on Hip-O/Universal Music.

Over the years, Evans also became an in-demand session vocalist appearing on recordings by Yolanda Adams, Natasha Bedingfield, Corbin Bleu, Boney James, Will Downing, Mick Fleetwood, Heather Headley, Chaka Khan, The Isley Brothers, Ledisi, Latoya London, Barry Manilow, Nicole C. Mullen, Mýa, Ruben Studdard, Paul Taylor, Luther Vandross, Vanessa Williams, Charlie Wilson and the soundtrack of High School Musical 2. In 2022, she supported Tears for Fears on stage in the US.

To date, Lauren has made her biggest impact to date as a songwriter. Several songs wrote for the NBC soap opera Passions led to two Emmy Award nominations for Evans. She has also worked with producers such as Robbie Nevil, will.i.am, Rex Rideout, Jimmy Jam & Terry Lewis, Rodney "Darkchild" Jerkins, J.R. Rotem and others.

Evans co-wrote the hit single "One Step at a Time" for American Idol season 6 winner Jordin Sparks, which was a Top 20 hit in the United States, United Kingdom, Australia, Canada and New Zealand. She has also scored worldwide hits with German pop trio Monrose's "Even Heaven Cries" (which peaked the Top 10 on the Official German Charts) and British X Factor winner Alexandra Burke's "Bad Boys"; which hit No. 1 on the Official UK Charts and went on to be nominated for 'Best British Single' at the 2010 BRIT Awards, as well as receiving a Platinum certification by the BPI.

Awards and nominations

Stellar Awards
The Stellar Awards is a Gospel Music Awards in the U.S., honoring Gospel Music artists, writers, and industry professionals. Chicago based production company Central City Productions Inc. spearheaded by founder, chairman & CEO Don Jackson, has produced the show since its inception in 1985.

|-
| rowspan=1 | 1999
| rowspan=1 | Lauren Evans (Credited as 'Christian')
| Contemporary Female Vocalist of The Year 
| 
|-

Daytime Emmy Awards 
The Daytime Emmy Award is an American accolade bestowed by the New York–based National Academy of Television Arts and Sciences in recognition of excellence in American daytime television programming.

|-
|rowspan="2"| 2004
|rowspan="1"| "Momma, Gotta Let Her Go" (Passions)
|rowspan="2"| Outstanding Original Song 
| 
|-
| "Last Piece of My Heart" (Passions)
| 
|-

BRIT Awards
The BRIT Awards (sometimes stylised as the BRIT Awards; often simply called the Brits) are the British Phonographic Industry's annual pop music awards. 

|-
| rowspan=1 | 2010
| rowspan=1 | "Bad Boys" (Alexandra Burke)
| Best British Single
| 
|-

Latin Grammy Awards
A Latin Grammy Award is an award by The Latin Academy of Recording Arts & Sciences to recognize outstanding achievement in the Latin music industry. The Latin Grammy honors works produced anywhere around the world that were recorded in either Spanish or Portuguese and is awarded in the United States.

|-
| rowspan=1 | 2014
| rowspan=1 | "Decidiste Dejarme" (Camila)
| Song of The Year
| 
|-

Billboard Latin Music Awards
The Billboard Latin Music Awards grew out of the Billboard Music Awards program from Billboard magazine, an industry publication charting the sales and radio airplay success of musical recordings. The Billboard awards are the Latin music industry's longest running and most prestigious award.

|-
| rowspan=1 | 2015
| rowspan=1 | "Decidiste Dejarme" (Camila)
| Latin Pop Song of The Year
| 
|-

ASCAP Latin Music Awards
The American Society of Composers, Authors and Publishers (ASCAP) is an American not-for-profit performance-rights organization (PRO) that protects its members' musical copyrights by monitoring public performances of their music, whether via a broadcast or live performance, and compensating them accordingly. ASCAP honors its top members in a series of annual awards shows in seven music categories: pop, rhythm and soul, film and television, Latin, country, Christian, and concert music.

|-
| rowspan=1 | 2015
| rowspan=1 | "Decidiste Dejarme" (Camila)
| Pop Category
| 
|-

Discography

Guest features 
Below is a list of songs that feature Lauren Evans as lead vocalist.

 1999: Lauren Evans (credited as Christian) – "Didn't I"
 2003: Maranatha! Music – "You're Worthy of My Praise”
 2003: Lauren Evans (credited as Char) - "Girlfriend"
 2005: The Avila Brothers – "Play For Me”
 2005: Paul Taylor – "Anything You Say”
 2006: Andrae Crouch – "Yes Lord”
 2007: Paul Taylor – "A Love of Your Own”
 2009: The Latin Project – "Onda”
 2010: Mike Phillips – "Time of Your Life”
 2014: Armin van Buuren – "Alone"
 2015: Elektrik Hearts – "Maybe Tonight"
 2015: Shaan – "Light up the world"
 2016: Antillas & Alpha Force – "The Love"
 2018: Black Eyed Peas – Get Ready

Songwriting credits
Below is a selective list of songs written or co-written by Lauren Evans.

See also 
 Jim Jonsin production discography
 Brian Kennedy
 Dapo Torimiro

References

External links 
 Official MySpace page
 
 

Living people
1983 births
20th-century African-American women singers
Songwriters from California
Singers from California
21st-century American singers
21st-century American women singers
African-American songwriters
21st-century African-American women singers